Wat Prasat, Nonthaburi (RTGS: Wat Prasat, pronounced [wát prās̄āth]), commonly known in English as the Temple of Prasat, Nonthaburi and officially as Wat Prasat, Nonthaburi, is considered the oldest temple in Nonthaburi. Located on Bang Kruai-Sai Noi Road (ถนนบางกรวยทรายน้อย), Bang Krang Sub-district is a temple with a gable design and a door arch of the Ubosot in Ayutthaya, Wat Prasat can be seen from the ubosot in the Maha Uttara style, which is that both side walls have no windows in front, with a castle-shaped door decorated with stucco patterns, behind only a small light hole. Wat Prasat was built in the reign of King Prasat Thong. Wat Prasat is now over 400 years old. Inside the temple have the oldest paintings in Nonthaburi and is registered as a national historic site, this temple is registered as a National Historic Site. In addition, inside the temple, there is also the Tripitaka Hall which holds the ancient serpent ladder and still has the largest Ta-khian tree in Thailand and is more than 1,000 years old which is a sacred thing that people respect and worship.

Background 
Wat Prasat is in Bang Krang Subdistrict, Mueang Nonthaburi District, Nonthaburi Province. It is assumed that it was built during the reign of King Prasat Thong (when he held the rank of Chao Phraya Defense Suriyawong (เจ้าพระยากลาโหมสุริยวงศ์) in the reign of King Songtham), Received Wisungkhamsima (วิสุงคามสีมา) in 1767, which was the second year after the loss of Ayutthaya.  Wat Prasat was built when King Prasat Thong came to set up a pavilion to dig a canal from Wat Tai Muang (วัดท้ายเมือง) to the mouth of Bang Kruai canal (ปากคลองบางกรวย) in front of Wat Khema Phirataram (วัดเขมาภิรตาราม) and a place to mobilize troops (barracks) to prepare to fight against the Burmese in Ayutthaya. Because there is supporting evidence including the main Buddha image located in the temple, the Fine Arts Department assumes that it is more than 400 years old. And due to its characteristics, so can be assumed that the person who built Wat Prasat must be the king. But some people assumed that Wat Prasat was built during the late Ayutthaya period during the reign of King Narai due to this temple has the mural here originated. This mural is the work of the most admired artist in the province. This is currently the oldest painting in Nonthaburi Province and it has the original items of the Tripitaka Hall are the pulpit stairs and the main Buddha image that is believed to have been with the temple with the Buddha base since the Ayutthaya period. The temple is in the Mahayana sect, a temple that was bestowed upon Wisungkhamsima (วิสุงคามสีมา) as a temple for tourism. Present this temple is registered as a National Historic Site. The date of construction is unknown. Some sources say that Wat Prasat was built in the reign of King Prasat Thong while others say that this temple was built in the reign of King Narai.

Ubosot 
The ordination hall was built in the late Ayutthaya period. The base of the chapel is bent like the bow of a junk boat, known as the elephant's belly (ตกท้องช้าง), The construction is meticulous. In front of the chapel is a carved wooden image of Narayana (พระนารายณ์) with Garuda. The front of the chapel has a beautiful old stucco pattern, although it has been damaged over time.  The entrance door of ubosot has 3 doors by decorating with the top of three golden prasat. In the past usually build with five top of golden prasat but the high of brick make the lower peek can't see maybe it's cut off because it's hard to build this kind of structure. If tourist observe carefully, people will see the architecture is very meticulous. The ubosot was built in a brick and cement style, art in the Ayutthaya period. There are 3 entrance doors to the ubosot with no windows. Another special feature is that there is a light hole behind the main Buddha image that allows light to spread throughout the Big Buddha image as if a light came out. It is another miracle and the wisdom that our [ancestors have created.

Interior 
Inside the ubosot, there is a principal Buddha image, which is the Buddha image in meditation posture and the apostles, Below the main Buddha image is surrounded by Buddha images on all sides. the principal Buddha image, known as Luang Por Yai (หลวงพ่อใหญ่) or Prasat Thong Buddha (พระพุทธรูปปราสาททอง). It is a stucco Buddha image in the posture of meditation. Enshrined with disciples and a group of stucco Buddha images in meditation posture and more than 25 subduing Mara, which is a sacred Buddha image that people worship. Roof area was made from shingle wood, inside ubosot is an offering Enshrined with disciples and more than 25 stucco Buddha images in the attitude of meditation and in the attitude of subduing Mara. The principal Buddha image and the Buddha image are arranged in groups around the main Buddha image from the “Chukchi base”. Sit and look around inside the church, the visitor can see murals depicting Thotjataka, which have eroded over time but are still in beautiful condition from the past to the present. By mural paintings in the late Ayutthaya period. Nonthaburi craftsmen have depicted the birth of ten Buddhas, which is considered one of the oldest murals in Nonthaburi. The mural is the story of the Tathagata Jataka, written with powder color, it represents the prosperity of Thai arts in the past. For mural Inside the ubosot, there are murals at the top depicting the Buddha's past, next down is Wittayathorn flying hands holding a lotus flower. Above the paintings on the story of Thotsachat Jataka separated by a standing angel supporting Anchalee facing the principal Buddha image at present, the paintings are very faded but still see the outline reflecting the culture, architecture, buildings including royal traditions in the Ayutthaya period such as siraphon adorning the head of a nobleperson. The procession of the military strategist, Yanmat, both supplications, salangs, architectural ornaments, and various costumes. The pulpit of Busabok Wat Prasat It is assumed that it was built in the late Ayutthaya period with a gable pattern like the door pattern of Wihan Noi (วิหารน้อย), Wat Na Phra Men (วัดหน้าพระเมรุ), It is a pattern system from the middle Ayutthaya period to the late Ayutthaya period gilded glass decorated the top of the castle.

Exterior 
The upper part has a sacred deity riding a mythical beast (Garuda) and the tail is decorated in Mon style. With a lion on the side at the end. It is an ubosot in the Maha-Ud style, which is the two side walls with no windows in front. There is a castle-shaped door decorated with stucco patterns. On the back, there is only a small hole in the light.

Transportation 
By car, drive along Phra Nang Klao Bridge until you reach the second red light intersection. Turn left into Bang Kruai. Pass Wat Suan Kaew (วัดสวนแก้ว), go straight to Bang Kruai - Sai Noi route. You will see a sign pointing the way to Wat Prasat.

By boat, get off the ferry at Nonthaburi Pier, cross the river and connect to a minibus at Bang Yai - Pier. The bus stop is close to Wat Chaloem Phrakiat (วัดเฉลิมพระเกียรติวรวิหาร).

Holy Tripitaka 
Inside, there is a "Holy Tripitaka in the middle of the water" built-in 1997. It is a wooden building above the ancient holy pond in the Ayutthaya period. The villagers call it the Holy Pond of Luang Pu Tum. Inside there is a centuries-old serpent staircase that has been preserved. Inside the Tripitaka Hall, there are still images and prayers to worship Phra Aestheticwani, who oversees the teachings of the Buddha in the Tripitaka. Including photos of Reverend Father-Son Dhammasaro (Im Boon) (หลวงพ่อสนธิ์ ธมฺมสโร (อิ่มบุญ)), the former abbot of Wat Prasat.

Temple area 
It is a temple that is not very large. Quiet atmosphere not many people. When walking inside the temple, the visitor will find the old ordination hall that is damaged.
The temple area also "Wihan Buraphachan (วิหารบูรพาจารย์)" is the enshrined image of Reverend Father-Son Dhammasaro (Im Boon) (หลวงพ่อสนธิ์ ธมฺมสโร (อิ่มบุญ)), the former abbot of Wat Prasat, Phra Kechi (พระเกจิ), the master of the ancient art, ammunition, his sacred object is famous for being invincible, teeth can't stab. Maha Ud is preferred throughout the Nonthaburi province and all over the country. Inside the temple, there is a dilapidated Thai-style wooden shrine. In addition, within the temple there are two pairs of hipped houses (เรือนปั้นหยาคู่สองหลัง). It is a European-style golden teak house. Built-in the reign of King Rama V roof with tiles all roofs collide like a pyramid without gables. It was used as a prayer hall in the reign of Reverend Father-Son Dhammasaro (Im Boon) (หลวงพ่อสนธิ์ ธมฺมสโร (อิ่มบุญ)), former abbot of the temple. Occupying the tree is a place of worship according to the beliefs of the Nonthaburi people. The Ta-khian tree was discovered on 3 November 2007 by the landowner Thang Mae who sold the land attached to Wat Prasat to Pinsiri Village and the village has given the macro truck to spot the pit to get down the pile. But can't go down because he digs to find a Ta-khian tree when it was brought in, it was found that it was a large Ta-khian tree. People who heard the news came to ask for the lottery and won the lottery, so people brought the three-colored cloth to worship. Later named Chao Mae Takhianthong (เจ้าแม่ตะเคียนทอง) "Kanjaya". In addition, within the temple, there is also a pulpit built in the middle to late Ayutthaya period located at the pavilion.

Abbot 
Reverend Father-Son Dhammasaro (Im Boon) (หลวงพ่อสนธิ์ ธมฺมสโร (อิ่มบุญ)), a former abbot of Wat Prasat famous monk Born on April 28, 1891, is a native of Nonthaburi. During school age, parents bring them to study. At the Wat Chaiyapruekmala Rajaworavihara School (สำนักเรียนวัดชัยพฤกษมาลาราชวรวิหาร), with Phra Nantawiriya (Pho Tissatasso) (พระนันทวิริยะ (โพธิ์ ติสสทัสโส)) as the abbot Assign a monk who is responsible for teaching Thai books to help teach. He was ordained on April 21, 1911, at 5.00 a.m. at Wat Chaiyapruekmala Ratchaworawihan (วัดชัยพฤกษมาลาราชวรวิหาร) with Phra Nantawiriya (Pho Tissatasso) (พระนันทวิริยะ (โพธิ์ ติสสทัสโส)) as the preceptor, Venerable Chuen (พระอธิการชื่น) of Wat Prasat as the First Ordination teacher and Phra Palat Lek (พระปลัดเล็ก) of Wat Chaiyapruekmala Ratchaworawihan (วัดชัยพฤกษมาลาราชวรวิหาร) is the Second Ordination teacher. Later Wat Prasat was empty the abbot, Phra Nanthawiriya (Pho Tissatasso) (พระนันทวิริยะ (โพธิ์ ติสสทัสโส)) at that time was the primate of Nonthaburi Province. Therefore, there was an order to appoint Reverend Father-Son Dhammasaro (Im Boon) (หลวงพ่อสนธิ์ ธมฺมสโร (อิ่มบุญ)) to move to be the abbot of Wat Prasat on November 27, 1929.

Nearby attractions 
Learning Center for ready-made garments and tie-dye fabrics, Kru Uthai filling machines (เครื่องถมอุทัย), Bang Krang Housewives Farmers Group, Moo 4, selling Elephant Garlic. The visitor can also take a minibus to make merit and donate clothes or unnecessary items at Wat Suan Kaew (วัดสวนแก้ว). And the visitor can buy second-hand items from Wat Suan Kaew (วัดสวนแก้ว) as well. The visitor can also take a boat across the Chao Phraya River to travel. Nonthaburi City Hall Which was built in 1910, the building is made of wood and retains the beauty of the past. The visitor can also walk to find delicious food from many shops in the vicinity which will have a wide variety of food. And there is also Wat Bot Don Phrom, where the visitor can go to make merit because the temples are close to each other. In Wat Bot Don Phrom (วัดโบสถ์ดอนพรหม), there will also be food for buffaloes. The visitor can take the Chao Phraya Express Boat at Nonthaburi Pier. And then take the next boat to Koh Kret (เกราะเกร็ด). On Koh Kret has a small community, there are restaurants, cafes, as well as a lot of local products for sale. And the visitor can take a minibus in front of Wat Prasat to visit Wat Borom Racha Kanchanapisek Memorial (วัดบรมราชากาญจนาภิเษกอนุสรณ์ คณะสงฆ์จีนนิกายรังสรรค์) (Wat Leng Nei Yi 2 (วัดเล่งเน่ยยี่ 2)) with very beautiful Chinese architecture and Buddhist art, giving it a similar resemblance to the Forbidden City in Beijing.

See also 
Wat Chaiwatthanaram
Meditation attitude

References

External links
Facebook Fanpage วัดปราสาท จังหวัดนนทบุรี Wat Prasat.

Buddhist temples in Nonthaburi Province